Denron Daniel (born 14 March 1989) is a Grenadian Association footballer who plays as a forward. He has also represented the Grenada national football team.

Daniel scored five goals for Grenada under-20s in their 17–0 win over the British Virgin Islands in their 2009 CONCACAF U-20 Championship qualifier match in May 2008.

He made his international debut for Grenada against United States on 7 April 2009. In his second appearances for Grenada, he scored his first international goal against Saint Vincent and the Grenadines.

International career

International goals
Scores and results list Grenada's goal tally first.

References

1989 births
Living people
Grenadian footballers
Grenada international footballers
2009 CONCACAF Gold Cup players
Association football forwards